The National Campaign for the Reform of the Obscene Publications Acts (NCROPA) was an anti-censorship campaigning organisation whose goal was the reform of Britain's obscenity laws, in particular the Obscene Publications Act 1959. It was set up in 1976 by the actor David Webb as a response to Mary Whitehouse's conservative morality group National Viewers and Listeners Association. NCROPA's original name was the National Campaign for the Repeal of the Obscene Publications Acts but it was soon amended. The last year for which NCROPA had any measurable activity was 1998, and with the death of its founder in June 2012 it effectively ceased to exist.

In December 2014 it was absorbed into the Campaign Against Censorship, an organisation with which it had had an overlapping membership. The NCROPA's archives are now held by Warwick University's Modern Records Centre.

Notable members
 Pamela Manson, actress (committee member)
 Gerald Fowler, politician and academic (committee member)
 John Julius Norwich, writer and historian (committee member)
 Mary Millington, model and actress

See also 
 Campaign Against Censorship
 Pornography in the United Kingdom

References

External links
Catalogue of the NCROPA archives, held at the Modern Records Centre, University of Warwick

1976 establishments in the United Kingdom
Censorship in the United Kingdom
Lobbying organisations in the United Kingdom
Civil liberties advocacy groups